The Viminal Hill is the smallest of the famous Seven Hills of Rome. A finger-shape cusp pointing toward central Rome between the Quirinal Hill to the northwest and the Esquiline Hill to the southeast, it is home to the Teatro dell'Opera and the Termini Railway Station.

At the top of Viminal Hill is the Palace of Viminale that hosts the headquarters of the Ministry of the Interior; currently the term Il Viminale means the Ministry of the Interior.

According to Livy, the hill first became part of the city of Rome, along with the Quirinal Hill, during the reign of Servius Tullius, Rome' sixth king, in the 6th century BC. The name of the hill derives from Latin viminalis (“pertaining to osiers”), from vimen (“a pliant twig, osier”).

See also

References

External links
Samuel Ball Platner, A Topographical Dictionary of Ancient Rome: Viminal Hill

Seven hills of Rome
Rome R. I Monti